Eric Anders is an American singer-songwriter based in California.

Music career 
Anders released his first album in 2003, at the age of 39. Not at One was produced by Anders and Richard Barron, and Anders collaborated on the songwriting with others including Mark O'Bitz and Benny Bohm. He had begun writing songs for the album as of December 2001. In 2004, Anders released the EP Songs For Wayward Days in protest of the upcoming Presidential election and the reelection bid of George W. Bush. It was produced and mixed by Jeff Peters.

In 2005 Anders released his second album, More Regrets, a 47-minute, 11-track album. His third album, Tethered to the Ground, was released in 2006. The album was produced by Matthew Emerson Brown. Anders' first four releases were all mixed by Jeff Peters.

After a five-year break, in 2011 Anders released the EP Remains In Me, also produced by Brown. After another five-year break, in 2016, Anders released the collection Big World Abide: The Best of Eric Anders, featuring songs from his previous albums. All the songs were remastered by Jeff Peters.

In 2017 Anders released the album Eleven Nine, which featured the Vilnius mural of Donald Trump kissing Vladimir Putin on its cover. The name of the album comes from the day on which President Trump was elected—the Ninth of November—as well as referencing the date of the 9/11 Attacks, another event that Anders sees as catastrophic to the U.S. The proceeds of the album are being donated to the Lambda Legal Fund.

The first music video from the album was created for the track "This Fire Has Burned Too Long". The second was for the song "Looking Forward to Your Fall."

In 2018, Anders released an album as a duo with guitarist-composer Mark O'Bitz, titled Of All These Things. In 2019, Anders and O'Bitz released Ghosts To Ancestors, their sophomore release as a duo.

Eric and Mark released a single, "Matterbloomlight". The single was included on their 2020 album - and the duo's third album together - American Bardo, which was created as an ode to the novel Lincoln in the Bardo by George Saunders. Anders and O'Bitz released the EP This Mortal Farce in 2020, also inspired by the same book.

Anders and O'Bitz released their single "Careful Now My Son" in December 2021 and then their album Sirens Go By in February 2021. These releases are the first and second installments of their multi-release collection that is based around the theme of "music in the time of the Coronavirus."

Discography 
Albums
 Not at One (September 13, 2003)
 More Regrets (February 7, 2005)
 Tethered to the Ground (March 21, 2006)
 Big World Abide (March 30, 2016)
 Eleven Nine (April 20, 2017)
 Of All These Things (June 2018) with Mark O'Bitz
 Ghosts to Ancestors (2019) with Mark O'Bitz
 American Bardo (2020) with Mark O'Bitz
 Sirens Go By (2021) with Mark O'Bitz
 Variant Blues (2021) with Mark O'Bitz
 Stuck Inside (2021) with Mark O'Bitz
	
EPs
 Songs For Wayward Days (August 17, 2004)
 Remains in Me (January 1, 2011)
 This Mortal Farce (2020) with Mark O'Bitz

Singles
 Matterbloomlight (October 2018) with Mark O'Bitz
 Searise (March 2021) with Mark O'Bitz
 True September Songs (December 2021) with Mark O'Bitz

References

Living people
American singer-songwriters
American political activists
Year of birth missing (living people)
American male singer-songwriters
21st-century American male singers
21st-century American singers